Chalarotona is a genus of moths of the Xyloryctidae (Xyloryctinae) family.

Species
 Chalarotona craspedota Meyrick, 1890
 Chalarotona insincera Meyrick, 1890
 Chalarotona intabescens Meyrick, 1890
 Chalarotona melipnoa Meyrick, 1890
 Chalarotona melitoleuca Meyrick, 1890

References

 
Xyloryctidae
Xyloryctidae genera